Da Hip Hop Witch is a 2000 American comedy film directed, produced and written by Dale Resteghini. A parody of the 1999 independent horror film The Blair Witch Project, the film features appearances by musicians Eminem, Mobb Deep, Ja Rule, Rah Digga, Killah Priest, Pras, Vitamin C and Vanilla Ice.

Plot
After learning about the "Hip Hop Witch", a powerful supernatural being that lurks in the ghettos and attacks upcoming rappers which makes their record sales go up, five suburban teenagers go on a quest to get their rap careers started by being attacked by this "Hip Hop Witch." Filming their experience, they run into past hip hop stars that have already battled the Witch in person.

Cast
Dale Resteghini as Will Hunting
Stacii Jae Johnson as Dee Dee Washington
Amy Dorris as Raven ( Rave Girl)
Parker Holt as Jerry (a.k.a. Da Retard)
Jordan Ashley as The Whisk
Steve Grillo as Muzzle
Elijah Rhoades as Big Z
Tony Prendatt as Lazarus
La the Darkman as the Street Don
David Scott Klein as Krump
Sheritta Duran as Josephine
Joyce Tanksley as Kitty Smith
Charlene Quashie as Elisabeth
Culver Casson as Sara
Jolene Vettese as Paula
Pamela Schamberge as Kathy
Dina Herdigein as Dina
William Harbour as Shaggy

As themselves
 Eminem as himself
Pras as himself
Vanilla Ice as himself
Ja Rule as  himself
Rah Digga as herself
Vitamin C as herself (credited as Vitamin-C)
Charli Baltimore as herself
Spliff Star as himself
 Killah Priest as himself
Mia Tyler as herself
 Royce da 5'9" as himself (credited as Royce 5'9")
 Outsidaz as themselves (credited as The Outsidaz)
 Severe as himself
 Mobb Deep as themselves
 Chris Simmons as himself
 The Cella Dwellas as themselves
 Made Men as themselves
 Professor X as himself
 Rock as himself
 Afu-Ra as himself
 Lidu Rock as himself
 Rhythm Trip as themselves

Release
Preceding the film's release, Eminem's lawyers attempted to have his scenes removed from the film, and tried to halt its distribution. In 2003, Artisan Entertainment planned to reissue the film on VHS and DVD with artwork prominently advertising Eminem's appearance in the film. Before the film's reissue, Artisan recalled copies featuring this artwork without official explanation.

References

External links

 

2000s parody films
American parody films
Films set in New York City
Films set in New Jersey
Films about witchcraft
2000s English-language films
2000s hip hop films
2000s American films